Whinhill Lock was built as part of the Driffield Navigation in the East Riding of Yorkshire, England. It was originally opened in 1770, and was restored in 2004.

Location

Located between the village of Wansford and town of Driffield, the lock is easily accessible from the B1249 road.

Situated on the Driffield Navigation
Next Place Upstream: Town Lock
Next Place Downstream: Wansford Lock

History

The lock was built during the construction of the Driffield Navigation between 1767 and 1770, and is a grade II listed structure. After the last traffic to Driffield stopped around 1945 the lock gradually fell into disrepair. In 1968 the Driffield Navigation Amenities Association started to restore and maintain the canal and its structures. Various "working parties" have been held at the lock over the years, to conserve the structure, but in 2004 a lottery grant was secured to restore and re-gate it.

The lock was reopened by the Mayor of Driffield Mrs Margaret Killin on 25 June 2005.

See also 

Driffield Navigation
Canal lock

References

External links

Buildings and structures in the East Riding of Yorkshire
Transport in the East Riding of Yorkshire
Locks on the Driffield Navigation
Grade II listed buildings in the East Riding of Yorkshire